USS Cimarron may refer to the following ships of the United States Navy:

  was a gunboat launched in 1862.
  was an oiler, launched in 1939 and decommissioned in 1968
  was an oiler, launched in 1979 and decommissioned in 1999

United States Navy ship names